Wilhelm Hempfing (15 July 1886 – 6 June 1948) was a German painter and printmaker.

Life and work
He was born in Schönau. He was a master student at the Kunstakademie Karlsruhe, where he studied with Friedrich Fehr. After completing his studies, he travelled extensively, to Italy, Spain, France, England and North Africa.

He was given "Special Importance" under the Nazi regime so, between 1937 and 1944, he had several exhibitions at the Große Deutsche Kunstausstellung in the Haus der Kunst in Munich. At least one of his works is known to have been purchased by Hitler, the nude  "Sitzende Blondine" (Sitting Blonde), which bore a striking resemblance to Eva Braun.

In addition to his government sponsored exhibitions, he had showings throughout Germany, in Vienna, and in Zürich. His works consist mostly of landscapes and nudes, with a few portraits and still-lifes of flowers. He also produced a large quantity of etchings, influenced by Conz, and was a book designer.

Hempfing died in Karlsruhe in 1948.

References

Further reading
 "Hempfing, Wilhelm". In: Hans Vollmer (Ed.): Allgemeines Lexikon der Bildenden Künstler von der Antike bis zur Gegenwart, Vol.16: Hansen–Heubach. E. A. Seemann, Leipzig 1923, pg.371
 Fritz Wilkendorf: "Wilhelm Hempfing, 1886-1948", In: Ekkhart, Badische Heimat (Yearbook) 1956, pp. 5–17
 Norbert Krämer:  Wilhelm Hempfing: der Figuren- und Landschaftsmaler aus Schönau im Odenwald (Exhibition catalog), Kaden, Heidelberg 2006,

External links

 More works by Hempfing @ ArtNet

20th-century German painters
20th-century German male artists
German male painters
1886 births
1948 deaths
20th-century German printmakers
People from Odenwaldkreis